St. John's Episcopal Church is a historic Episcopal church located at Lafayette, Tippecanoe County, Indiana.  Founded by Parson Samuel R. Johnson, early services were held beginning in 1836–37 in the counting room of Thomas Benbridge. Benbridge had an accounting office. The first building dedicated on 30 Dec 1838 on Missouri St.  A new Gothic Revival style church was built in 1858 on the Northwest corner of Sixth and Ferry.  Major repairs were completed in 1887 with the addition of a Sunday School.

It was listed on the National Register of Historic Places in 1978.  It is located in the Centennial Neighborhood District.

References

Gothic Revival church buildings in Indiana
Churches completed in 1858
19th-century Episcopal church buildings
Churches in Lafayette, Indiana
Churches on the National Register of Historic Places in Indiana
Episcopal church buildings in Indiana
National Register of Historic Places in Tippecanoe County, Indiana
Individually listed contributing properties to historic districts on the National Register in Indiana